Sofron Stefan Mudry, O.S.B.M (27 November 1923 – 31 October 2014) was a Ukrainian Bishop of the Ukrainian Catholic Church.

Sofron Stefan Mudry was born in Zolochiv, Poland, was ordained a priest in the Religious Order of Saint Basil the Great on 25 December 1958. He was elected the Coadjutor bishop to the  Ukrainian Catholic Eparchy of Ivano-Frankivsk on 2 March 1996 and ordained a bishop on 12 May 1996. Elected bishop to the Ukrainian Catholic Eparchy of Ivano-Frankivsk on 7 November 1997 and would remain in the post until his retirement on 2 June 2005.

See also
Ukrainian Catholic Eparchy of Ivano-Frankivsk
Ukrainian Greek Catholic Church

External links
Catholic-Hierarchy

20th-century Roman Catholic bishops in Ukraine
Order of Saint Basil the Great
Bishops of the Ukrainian Greek Catholic Church
1923 births
2014 deaths
People from Zolochiv, Lviv Oblast
People from Tarnopol Voivodeship
Pontifical Oriental Institute alumni
Bishops of the Ukrainian Catholic Archeparchy of Ivano-Frankivsk